AIO, Aio or AiO may refer to:

Adapt, Improvise, Overcome

Arts, entertainment, and media
Adventures in Odyssey, an Evangelical Christian-themed radio drama/comedy series
Äio, a 2010 folk-metal album from Estonian folk-metal group Metsatöll
Aio, a character in the 2005 drama fantasy action TV series Darna (2005 TV series)
Mio Aio, Takumi Aio, and/or Yūji Aio, characters from the Japanese novel and film Be with You
Aio, the fictional world of the video game Rise of Nations: Rise of Legends

Businesses and organizations
Aio Wireless, former subsidiary unit of AT&T Inc. that provided prepaid wireless service
Anthropological Index Online, international indexing service for anthropology

Computing
AIO Robotics, an American 3D Printer company
Asynchronous I/O
All-in-one (closed-loop), a liquid cooling system for a CPU
All-in-one desktop computer

People
 Aio (monk), a fabricated monk of Crowland Abbey in Lincolnshire, England
 Aio of Friuli (9th century), probable Duke of Friuli, northeast Italy
 AiO (Ai Ōtsuka), a J-pop singer
 Aiō, an alternate spelling for Ay-O, the Japanese rainbow painter from Fluxus

Other uses
Aio, Yamaguchi, a town in Yamaguchi Prefecture, Japan
AIO variables (Activity, Interest, Opinion), a type of psychographics measure
Atlantic Municipal Airport (IATA/FAA code AIO)

See also
All in One (disambiguation), with various specific meanings